The 1965 Turkish census was held on October 24, 1965 and recorded the population and demographic details of every settlement in Turkey. The 1965 census was the last census with information languages and ethnicities as afterwards, the Turkish Government prohibited their publication.

1965 census

Settlement population 
Population 10,000 last localities are listed below.

Gallery of ethno-linguistic maps

References 
Notes

Sources
 Türkiye İstatistik Kurumu

External links 

 

Censuses in Turkey
1965 in Turkey
Turkey